British Railways Class D16/2 was a class of prototype diesel locomotives built by British Railways at Ashford Works and introduced in 1950–1951, with a third example being introduced in 1954. They had been designed by Oliver Bulleid for the Southern Railway and were authorised in February 1947 but did not appear until after nationalisation. The diesel engine and transmission were supplied by English Electric, but the Bulleid influence was obvious. The box-like body style closely resembled Bulleid's electric locomotives and was quite different from the usual English Electric style, typified by British Rail Class D16/1 which in turn was strongly influenced by contemporary American design.

Percy Bollen's bogie design and the power train of 10203 were taken almost unmodified for the first ten production British Rail Class 40s but with a more traditional English Electric design of body with prominent noses and louvred side panels.

Operation

The original locomotives, numbered 10201 and 10202, worked services on the Southern Region of British Railways. They were transferred to Camden depot in the London Midland Region in April 1955.

It was trialled on the Southern Region before joining its sisters on the London Midland, being allocated to Willesden depot.

All three locomotives were non-standard with regards to spare parts and servicing, and they were withdrawn at the end of 1963. After spending some time on the scrap line at Derby Litchurch Lane Works, they were eventually scrapped at Cashmore's at Great Bridge in 1968.

Additional information
 Bogie wheelbase (rigid): 
 Bogie wheelbase (total): 
 Bogie pivot centres: 
 Sanding equipment: Pneumatic
 Heating boiler: Spanner
 Gear ratio: Originally 17:65, amended to 19:61
 Boiler water capacity: 
 Boiler fuel capacity: From main supply

Footnotes

References

Further reading 

 

 No.I, 2 Oct. 1953, pp.424-427, No.II, 9 Oct. 1953, pp.451-453
 No.I, 25 May 1956, pp.550-553, No.II, 1 June 1956, pp.588-591

External links 

 
 
 Photo of 10201 in Birmingham New Street

D016.02
1Co-Co1 locomotives
Railway locomotives introduced in 1950
Scrapped locomotives
Standard gauge locomotives of Great Britain
Diesel-electric locomotives of Great Britain